What Comes Around (formerly titled Roost) is a 2022 American drama-thriller film, directed and produced by Amy Redford, from a screenplay by Scott Organ, based upon his play The Thing With Feathers. It stars Summer Phoenix, Grace Van Dien, Jesse Garcia, Kyle Gallner, Indiana Affleck, Reina Hardesty and Sierra Nicole Rose.

It had its world premiere at the 2022 Toronto International Film Festival on September 15, 2022.

Plot
Troubles arise between a mother and daughter, once the daughter is seduced online by an older man.

Cast
 Summer Phoenix as Beth
 Grace Van Dien as Anna
 Jesse Garcia as Tim
 Kyle Gallner as Eric
 Indiana Affleck as Denny
 Reina Hardesty as Brit
 Sierra Nicole Rose as Ashley

Production
Scott Organ sent Amy Redford his play The Thing With Feathers, with Redford wanting to adapt it into a feature film. Principal photography took place in Salt Lake City, Utah during the COVID-19 pandemic.

Release
The film had its world premiere at the 2022 Toronto International Film Festival on September 15, 2022. In October 2022, IFC Films acquired U.S. distribution rights to the film, and re-titled the film What Comes Around.

Reception
On Rotten Tomatoes it has a 44% approval rating based on reviews from 9 critics, with an average rating of 4.90/10.

References

External links
 
 

2022 films
American thriller drama films
Films shot in Salt Lake City
IFC Films films